Conor Meechan (born 1993) is a Scottish film editor. He is best known for editing the film, The Groundsman which earned him the Best Editor accolade at the 2014 British Academy Scotland New Talent Awards.

Life and career
Conor studied Digital Film and Television at the Royal Conservatoire of Scotland. During his time there, he edited The Groundsman, the graduation film of fellow student Jonny Blair. His work on the film was widely praised and in 2014, he went on to win the Best Editor accolade at the 2014 British Academy Scotland New Talent Awards. He went on to study at the National Film and Television School where he won the Avid Award for Excellence in Editing for his work on the short film Fake News Fairytale.

Conor's recent work includes editing My Mum Tracy Beaker.

Selected filmography

Awards and nominations

See also
The Groundsman
2014 British Academy Scotland New Talent Awards

References

External links

Conor Meechan Official Website

Living people
British film editors
Scottish film editors
Alumni of the Royal Conservatoire of Scotland
Alumni of the National Film and Television School
British Academy Scotland New Talent Award Winners
1993 births